The Buffalo Bandits are a professional box lacrosse team in the East Division of the National Lacrosse League (NLL). They play at the KeyBank Center in Buffalo, New York. The Bandits played in the Major Indoor Lacrosse League from 1992 to 1997, then in its successor the NLL since 1998.

The Bandits are owned by Hockey Western New York LLC, a division of Pegula Sports and Entertainment led by Terry Pegula who also owns the Buffalo Sabres and the Buffalo Bills.

History
The Bandits played their first season in 1992.  They played home games at Buffalo Memorial Auditorium sharing with the Buffalo Sabres until its closure in 1996.

The Bandits became the first expansion franchise in MILL/NLL history to win a championship in its first season. The Bandits repeated as champions in their second season (compiling the league's only perfect season to date that year), lost the Championship game their third season and captured their third Championship in 1996, their fifth season. It was not until 1999, their eighth season, that the Bandits did not make the playoffs.

Since their 1996 Championship-winning season, the Bandits returned to the NLL Championship game on three separate occasions (1997, 2004, 2006) only to lose each time (including twice at home). It wouldn't be until 2008 that the Bandits would win their elusive fourth Championship, a 14–13 triumph over Portland.

As of 2018, Buffalo is the longest tenured team in the NLL, in terms of continuous years in their home city, at 27 seasons. (They are not the longest tenured franchise; the New England Black Wolves operate on the franchise of the Philadelphia Wings and the Colorado Mammoth were originally the Baltimore Thunder with previous stops as the Pittsburgh Crossefire in 2000 and Washington Power in 2001 & 2002.)

Awards and honors

NLL Hall of Fame members
 Les Bartley, Head Coach, 2006
 Darris Kilgour, Forward, 2007
 John Mouradian, General Manager, 2008
 Jim Veltman, Defense, 2009
 Rich Kilgour, Transition, 2010
 Steve Dietrich, Goaltender, 2012
 Pat O'Toole, Goaltender, 2013
 Tracey Kelusky, Forward, 2016
 John Tavares, Forward, 2016
Pat McCready, Defense, 2021
Shawn Williams, Forward, 2021

NLL records

Single-game record holders 
 Most assists in a single game – Mark Steenhuis (13 assists, February 14, 2009)
 Most points in a single game – Mark Steenhuis (17 points, February 14, 2009)

Season record holders
 Most points in a single season – Dhane Smith (137 points, 2016)
Most goals in a single season –  Dhane Smith (72 goals, 2016)

All-time record holders
 Most goals in a career – John Tavares (724 goals, 1991–2015)
 Most assists in a career – John Tavares (823 assists, 1991–2015)
 Most points in a career – John Tavares (1,547 points, 1991–2015)
Most saves in a career – Matt Vinc (8,299 saves 2005–Present)
Most wins in a career – Matt Vinc (119 wins 2005–Present) 
Most minutes played – Matt Vinc (12,627:54 2005–Present)

NLL All-Star Game
2005: Kyle Couling, Mark Steenhuis, John Tavares*, Dan Teat
2006: Steve Dietrich, Mark Steenhuis, John Tavares*
2007: Pat McCready, Mark Steenhuis, John Tavares*
2008: Mark Steenhuis*, John Tavares*, Chris White
2009: Ken Montour*, Mark Steenhuis*, John Tavares, Roger Vyse, Chris White*
2011: Chris White, Mark Steenhuis, John Tavares, Brett Bucktooth
2012: Billy Dee Smith, Scott Self, Chris White, John Tavares, Mike Thompson
* – voted as starter

Current roster

All-time record

All-time team-by-team records
(active NLL franchises only)

Playoff results

All-time team-by-team playoff records
(Active NLL franchises only)

Head coaching history

Draft history

NLL Entry Draft
First Round Selections

 1991: Darris Kilgour (1st overall)
 1992: Tom Marechek (6th overall)
 1993: Gil Nieuwendyk (6th overall)
 1994: Rodd Squire (5th overall)
 1995: Jason Luke (3rd overall)
 1996: Mike Murray (6th overall)
 1997: Casey Zaph (7th overall) & Marty O'Brien (8th overall)
 1998: Matt Disher (7th overall)
 1999: None
 2000: Ryan Powell (2nd overall)
 2001: None
 2002: Billy Dee Smith (3rd overall)
 2003: A.J. Shannon (6th overall)
 2004: Delby Powless (1st overall)
 2005: Jeff Shattler (10th overall)
 2006: Brett Bucktooth (3rd overall)
 2007: None
 2008: None
 2009: Kyle Clancy (10th overall)
 2010: Travis Irving (9th overall)
 2011: None
 2012: Dhane Smith (5th overall)
 2013: None
 2014: Brandon Goodwin (9th overall)
 2015: None
 2016: None
 2017: Josh Byrne (1st overall)
 2018: Matt Gilray (3rd overall) & Ian MacKay (4th overall)
 2019: Brent Noseworthy (12th overall)
 2020: Brad McCulley (9th overall)
 2021: Tehoka Nanticoke (3rd overall) & Thomas Vaesen (14th Overall)

NLL Dispersal Draft
2002 from Montreal Express: Aime Caines (6th overall); Kelly Sullivan (18th overall)
2003 from Ottawa Rebel: Jason Clark (9th overall); Marc Landriault (20th overall); Mike Hamilton (31st overall)
2004 from Vancouver Ravens: Curt Malawsky (9th overall); Declined to pick (18th overall)
2005 from Anaheim Storm: Traded to Arizona (9th overall)
2007 from Arizona Sting & Boston Blazers: Craig Conn, Arizona (10th overall); Brian Croswell, Boston (15th overall); Joe Smith, Arizona (34th overall)
2008 from Arizona Sting: Greg Hinman (13th overall)
2008 from Chicago Shamrox: Cody Jacobs (12th overall); Cory Stringer (21st overall)
2009 from Portland LumberJax: Jamison Koesterer (9th overall)
2010 from Orlando Titians: Jesse Guerin (16th overall) & Matt Brown (26th overall)
2011 from Boston Blazers: Kevin Buchanan (6th overall) & Damon Edwards (15th overall)

NLL Expansion Draft
1999 to Albany Attack: Troy Cordingley (3rd overall)
2001 to Calgary Roughnecks, New Jersey Storm, Vancouver Ravens & Columbus Landsharks: Rich Catton, Vancouver (3rd overall); Phil Wetherup, Columbus (4th overall); Andy Duden, Columbus (10th overall); Peter Talmo, New Jersey (21st overall)
2004 to Minnesota Swarm: Jason Clark (N/A overall)
2005 to Portland Lumberjax & Edmonton Rush: Mike Hominuck, Portland (1st overall); Thomas Montour, Portland (13th overall)
2006 to Chicago Shamrox & New York Titans: Bryan Kazarian, Chicago (13th overall); Jon Harasym, Portland (15th overall)
2007 to Boston Blazers: Brendan Thenhaus (7th overall)
2008 to Boston Blazers: Kyle Laverty (4th overall)
2018 to San Diego Seals & Philadelphia Wings: Vaughn Harris (15th overall); Davide DiRuscio (17th overall)
2019 to Rochester Knighthawks & New York Riptide: Shawn Evans (1st overall); Jordan Durston (2nd overall) 
2020 to Panther City Lacrosse Club: Liam Patten (8th overall)

Retired numbers
The Bandits have four retired numbers, three of which are represented at the Arena in the rafters with the Championship banners.

34 Thomas Gardner, western New York youth lacrosse organizer, March 20, 1999
43 Darris Kilgour, F, March 25, 2001
16 Rich Kilgour, D, April 16, 2011
11 John Tavares, F, March 11, 2016

Equipment Manager – John Craig, February 2, 2012 (retired by the Bandits and given a ceremony)

Game broadcasts
Buffalo Bandits games can be heard on Buffalo's Entercom stations, either WGR 550 AM or WWKB 1520 AM. John Gurtler, former play-by-play man for the Buffalo Sabres, handles announcing duties, while former Bandit Randy Mearns handles color commentary. Home games are streamed live on NLL.com.

Footnotes and references

See also

 Buffalo Bandits seasons
 Buffalo Bandits all-time roster

External links
 Official Website
 2017–2018 Media Guide

 
Sports in Buffalo, New York
Lacrosse clubs established in 1992
Lacrosse teams in New York (state)
Major Indoor Lacrosse League teams
Pegula Sports and Entertainment
National Lacrosse League teams
1992 establishments in New York (state)